Matías Rodrigo Córdoba (born 16 April 1999) is an Argentine professional footballer who plays as a midfielder or forward for Deportivo Morón, on loan from Talleres.

Career
Córdoba began his senior career in Torneo Federal B with Tiro y Gimnasia, a club of his birthplace. He scored three goals in thirty-seven fixtures in the fourth tier between 2014 and 2016, prior to securing a move to Primera B Nacional side Gimnasia y Esgrima in 2017. After twelve months in their reserve set-up, Córdoba moved into the club's first-team ahead of the 2018–19 campaign. His professional debut arrived during a fixture on 25 August with Arsenal de Sarandí, before netting his first goal on 22 September against Santamarina; days after he had signed his first pro contract. He scored four further goals that season.

In September 2020, after seven goals in thirty-six matches for Gimnasia y Esgrima, Córdoba was signed on loan by Primera División outfit Talleres. In January 2022, Talleres triggered the purchase option and signed Córdoba permanently. Due to knee injuries, he wasn't able to play for Talleres and in June 2022, Talleres loaned him out to Deportivo Morón until the end of the year.

Career statistics
.

References

External links

1999 births
Living people
Sportspeople from Jujuy Province
Argentine footballers
Association football midfielders
Association football forwards
Primera Nacional players
Gimnasia y Esgrima de Jujuy footballers
Talleres de Córdoba footballers
Deportivo Morón footballers